Tazeh Kand (also Romanized as Tāzeh Kand) is a village in Tazeh Kand Rural District, Khosrowshahr District, Tabriz County, East Azerbaijan Province, Iran. At the 2006 census, its population was 1,778, in 465 families.

References 

Populated places in Tabriz County